Deborah Cecile "Debbie" Jabbour (born 1954 or 1955)  is a Canadian politician who was elected in the 2015 Alberta general election to the Legislative Assembly of Alberta representing the electoral district of Peace River. She is a provisional psychologist at the Addictions & Mental Health ward of the Northwest Health Centre in High Level, Alberta, where she moved in 2014.

Electoral history

2019 general election

2015 general election

References

1950s births
Alberta New Democratic Party MLAs
Living people
Politicians from Edmonton
Women MLAs in Alberta
21st-century Canadian politicians
21st-century Canadian women politicians